The Academia de Lenguas Mayas de Guatemala, or ALMG (English: Guatemalan Academy of Mayan Languages) is a Guatemalan organisation that regulates the use of the 22 Mayan languages spoken within the borders of the republic. It has expended particular efforts on standardising the various writing systems used. Another of its functions is to promote Mayan culture, which it does by providing courses in the country's various Mayan languages and by training Spanish-Mayan interpreters.

It was founded on 16 November 1990 as an autonomous state organization, following publication of the Ley de la Academia de Lenguas Mayas de Guatemala, which had been passed by Congress the previous October.

It is headquartered in Guatemala City's Zone 10, in what was formerly the official residence of the Minister of Defence at the time of the Civil War, during which the government pursued a policy of genocide against the country's indigenous Maya population.

Orthography
The ALMG have developed the most widely used orthographies for the Mayan languages. The Mayan languages in Mexico use different orthographies developed by INALI.

For the languages that make a distinction between palato-alveolar and retroflex affricates and fricatives (Mam, Ixil, Tektitek, Awakatek, Qʼanjobʼal, Poptiʼ, and Akatek in Guatemala, and Yucatec in Mexico) the ALMG suggests the following set of conventions.

Notes

References
French, Brigittine. 2004. The politics and semiotics of sounds – Mayan linguistics and nation-building in Guatemala. Collegium Antropologicum 28, Supplement 1:249–255.
Fischer, E. F., & Brown, R. M. (Eds.). (2010). Maya cultural activism in Guatemala. University of Texas Press.
Rostica, J. C. (2007). Las organizaciones mayas de Guatemala y el diálogo intercultural. Política y cultura, (27), 75–97.
England, N. C. (2003). Mayan language revival and revitalization politics: Linguists and linguistic ideologies. American anthropologist, 105(4), 733–743.

The original version of this article was translated, with adaptations, from the corresponding article on the Spanish-language Wikipedia.

External links
Academia de Lenguas Mayas de Guatemala, official website

Cultural organizations based in Guatemala
Mayan languages
Language regulators
Mesoamerican studies